The Louisville Metro Council is the city council of Louisville, Kentucky (Louisville Metro).  It was formally established in January 2003 upon the merger of the former City of Louisville with Jefferson County and replaced the city's Board of Aldermen and the county's Fiscal Court (three county commissioners). Louisville City Hall houses the offices and chambers of the council.

The Metro Council consists of twenty-six seats corresponding to districts apportioned by population throughout Jefferson County. Although all cities in Jefferson County, apart from Louisville, retained their status after the merger, their residents are represented on Metro Council and vote alongside other county residents. The seats come up for reelection every four years, using a staggered process so that only half of the seats are up every two years.

Since the council's inception, Democrats have maintained a majority in the chamber, currently with nineteen members (73.1%).  Democrats gained two seats in the 2010 election and another 2 seats in the 2018 midterms.

History

The first semblance of local government came shortly after the settlement began. This was originally considered part of Virginia. In 1779, pioneering founders elected five men as "trustees". In 1780 the town was formerly chartered and the Virginia legislature provided for local government by nine legislature-appointed trustees. When Kentucky became a state in 1792, the Kentucky legislature took over the appointments.

Trustees did not have to live in Louisville until a 1795 law change. In 1797 citizens were given home rule and the privilege of electing trustees. Most important decisions were made at the state level, and the trustees were administrators rather than legislators.

When Louisville was incorporated as Kentucky's first city in 1828, it gained greater autonomy. A ten-member "Common Council" was founded, to be headed by a mayor. In 1851 the city was given a new charter, keeping the Common Council as a "lower house" to the Board of Aldermen, an "upper house" of the city's legislative power. In 1929 the larger but less prestigious Common Council was eliminated. This legislative system continued until City-County Merger.

The 26-seat Louisville Metro Council was formally established in January 2003 upon the merger of the former City of Louisville with Jefferson County. It replaced both the city's Board of Aldermen and the county's Fiscal Court (three county commissioners).

Council President 
The Louisville Metro Council President is the presiding officer of the council.  The Council President is elected annually by a majority vote of the entire council at the council's first meeting in January. Currently the Council President is David James (D), who was elected unanimously on January 18, 2018.

Council Presidents:

List of members

Ordinances 
In 2006, the council passed two controversial ordinances: a smoking ban in October and the so-called "Dangerous dog" ordinance in December. In 2007, the council considered a ban on trans fats and non-biodegradable plastic bags.

One Touch Make Ready

On February 11, 2016, the City Council of Louisville, Kentucky voted 23-0 to adopt a One Touch Make-Ready ordinance, making it the first city in the country to adopt such legislation.  According to city councilman Bill Hollander, who sponsored the legislation "This will help businesses locate here and grow here.  It will create jobs, and will retain and attract our young people and make Louisville broadband ready."  These sentiments were echoed by Louisville Mayor Greg Fischer, who stated that it would help lay the groundwork for entities like Google Fiber, and said "Tonight's vote puts Louisville one step closer toward becoming a Google Fiber city."  The legislation states that an applicant for attachment must first receive approval from the existing pole owners, at which point it may contract a pre-approved construction crew to perform all make ready work at its own expense. Pole owners and pre-existing providers whose wires were moved may choose to do post-make ready work inspections and call for remedial work if needed, at the new provider’s expense. The ordinance's passing directly led to multiple lawsuits involving the city.

Breonna's Law

On June 10, 2020, the Metro Council unanimously approved ″Breonna's Law″ banning no-knock search warrants after the 26-year-old emergency room technician was killed by Louisville police on March 13, and the city erupted in violent protests on May 28. Police Chief Steve Conrad was fired on June 1 after the fatal shooting of black business owner David McAtee.

See also 

 List of mayors of Louisville, Kentucky
 Greg Fischer, currently the Mayor of Louisville Metro
 Government of Louisville, Kentucky
 Local government in the United States

References

External links 
 
 Louisville-Jefferson County, Kentucky Metro Government Code of Ordinances
  — shows the voting history of each member of the council

County government agencies in Kentucky
Government of Louisville, Kentucky
Kentucky city councils
2003 establishments in Kentucky